The Xi'an Glory International Financial Center (Chinese: 西安国瑞国际金融中心) is a 75-story building located on Jinye Road in Xi'an, Shaanxi, China. With a height of 350 meters (1,148 feet), it is the tallest building in Northwest China.

History
The building was proposed in 2014. Construction started in 2015, and was finished in 2022. As of 2021, it is architecturally topped-out and expected to be fully complete in 2021.

See also
List of tallest buildings

References

Skyscrapers in Xi'an
2022 establishments in China